Snowboarding is a sport at the Winter Olympic Games. It was first included in the 1998 Winter Olympics in Nagano, Japan. Snowboarding was one of five new sports or disciplines added to the Winter Olympic program between 1992 and 2002, and was the only one not to have been a previous medal or demonstration event. In 1998, four events, two for men and two for women, were held in two specialities: the giant slalom, a downhill event similar to giant slalom skiing; and the half-pipe, in which competitors perform tricks while going from one side of a semi-circular ditch to the other. Canadian Ross Rebagliati won the men's giant slalom and became the first athlete to win a gold medal in snowboarding. Rebagliati was briefly stripped of his medal by the International Olympic Committee (IOC) after testing positive for marijuana. However, the IOC's decision was reverted following an appeal from the Canadian Olympic Association. For the 2002 Winter Olympics, giant slalom was expanded to add head-to-head racing and was renamed parallel giant slalom. In 2006, a third event, the snowboard cross, was held for the first time. In this event, competitors race against each other down a course with jumps, beams and other obstacles. On July 11, 2011, the International Olympic Committee's Executive Board approved the addition of Ski and Snowboard Slopestyle to the Winter Olympics roster of events, effective in 2014. The decision was announced via press conference from the IOC's meeting in Durban, South Africa. A fifth event, parallel slalom, was added only for 2014. Big air was added for 2018.

Six athletes have won at least two medals. Shaun White of the United States is the only triple gold medalist.  Philipp Schoch of Switzerland and Seth Wescott of the United States are the only double gold medalists. Karine Ruby of France and Americans Ross Powers and Danny Kass also won two medals. As of the 2014 Winter Olympics, 90 medals (30 of each color) have been awarded since 1998, and have been won by snowboarders from 21 National Olympic Committees.

Summary

Events

Men's

Women's

Mixed

Note 1. Giant slalom in 1998; parallel giant slalom since 2002.

Medal table

Sources (after the 2022 Winter Olympics):
Accurate as of 2022 Winter Olympics.

Number of athletes by nation

See also
List of Olympic venues in snowboarding

References

Olympic Committee Data
 

NBC Olympic Coverage

External links

 
Sports at the Winter Olympics
Olympics